Faster is the seventh studio album by American singer-songwriter Samantha Fish. It was released on September 10, 2021, under Rounder Records. The album was produced by Martin Kierszenbaum at the Village studio in West Los Angeles.

Critical reception 

Faster was met with some favorable reviews from critics. At Metacritic, which assigns a weighted average rating out of 100 to reviews from mainstream publications, this release received an average score of 75, based on 5 reviews.

Track listing

Personnel 
Adapted from the liner notes.

 Samantha Fish - vocals, guitar
 Hannah Brier - vocals
 Diego Navaira - bass
 Josh Freese - drums
 Martin Kierszenbaum - electric piano, organ, synthesizer, guitar, percussion
 Tech N9ne - vocals track 8

Charts

References 

Album chart usages for Wallonia
Samantha Fish albums
2021 albums